Petersburg is an unincorporated community in Muscatine County, Iowa, United States. It lies at an elevation of 771 feet (235 m). The community is part of the Muscatine Micropolitan Statistical Area.

References

Unincorporated communities in Iowa
Unincorporated communities in Muscatine County, Iowa
Muscatine, Iowa micropolitan area